Gerard Nash (born 27 February 1959) is an Irish Catholic bishop. He was appointed Bishop of Ferns on 11 June 2021 and consecrated on 5 September 2021.

Early life
Nash was born in Glandree, in the parish of Tulla, County Clare, on 27 February 1959, one of four children to the late Tommy and Mary Nash. He has three sisters, one of whom predeceased him. Nash attended St Joseph's Secondary School in Tulla, where he completed his Leaving Certificate. He then studied business and economics at the National Institute of Higher Education in Limerick, and worked afterwards in the manufacturing industry. He subsequently attended seminary for the Diocese of Killaloe at St Patrick's College, Maynooth, and was ordained to the Catholic priesthood on 15 June 1991.

Presbyteral ministry
Nash's first pastoral assignment was as chaplain of the vocational school in Roscrea, and as priest responsible for the local youth centre. After five years, he was appointed as general manager of Clarecare, a non-profit enterprise which provides a range of social services to people in County Clare, a position he held until 2003. Nash was also appointed curate in Corofin in 1996, before being appointed resident priest in 2003, as part of the first grouping of parishes in the Diocese of Killaloe. He remained as resident priest in the newly created Imeall Bóirne pastoral area when he moved to Crusheen in 2007.

Nash was appointed as Diocesan Secretary in 2010, while continuing his ministry in Imeall Bóirne. He was appointed episcopal vicar for pastoral development for the diocese in 2016.

Episcopal ministry
Nash was appointed Bishop-elect of Ferns by Pope Francis on 11 June 2021, succeeding Denis Brennan. He was consecrated by the Archbishop of Dublin, Dermot Farrell, on 5 September in St. Aidan's Cathedral, Enniscorthy.

References

See also 

 Catholic Hierarchy
 GCatholic

1959 births
20th-century Irish Roman Catholic priests
21st-century Roman Catholic bishops in Ireland
21st-century Irish Roman Catholic priests
Alumni of St Patrick's College, Maynooth
Alumni of the University of Limerick
Living people
People from County Clare
Roman Catholic bishops of Ferns